Violin Concerto No. 2 in D minor, Op. 22, by the Polish violin virtuoso, Henryk Wieniawski, may have been started in 1856, but the first performance did not take place until November 27, 1862, when he played it in St. Petersburg with Anton Rubinstein conducting. It was published in 1879, inscribed to his dear friend Pablo de Sarasate. 

Written during the relatively stable period of Wieniawski's residence in St Petersburg, the second Violin Concerto in D minor, op.22 is generally considered as his finest work. Richly melodic and highly idiomatic the work balances the elements of style dispassionately and serenely. Wieniawski first played the work in St Petersburg on 27 November 1862 under the baton of Anton Rubinstein.

The second violin concerto remains one of the most popular violin concertos of the Romantic era, memorable for its lush and moving melodies and harmonies.

Structure 
The work is in three movements:

Instrumentation 
The concerto is scored for solo violin and an orchestra consisting of 2 flutes, 2 oboes, 2 clarinets, 2 bassoons, 2 horns, 2 trumpets, 3 trombones (alto, tenor and bass), timpani, and strings.

References 
 Golding, Robin (1991). Wieniawski: Violin Concertos Nos. 1 & 2, Sarasate: Zigeunerweisen. Deutsche Grammophon GmbH, Hamburg, pp. 1-2.

External links 
 
 

Wieniawski 02
Compositions by Henryk Wieniawski
1862 compositions